The Soviet Union's 1971 nuclear test series was a group of 23 nuclear tests conducted in 1971. These tests followed the 1970 Soviet nuclear tests series and preceded the 1972 Soviet nuclear tests series.

References

1971
1971 in the Soviet Union
1971 in military history
Explosions in 1971